is a public park in Kōhoku Ward, Yokohama, Japan. It contains Nissan Stadium, a number of sporting fields and a birdwatching area. Nissan stadium is the largest stadium in Yokohama city and has a capacity of 72,000 spectators.

During a typhoon in October 2017 the park was partially flooded.

References

1998 establishments in Japan
Parks and gardens in Kanagawa Prefecture
Tourist attractions in Yokohama